Edward Savage may refer to:

Edward Savage (footballer) (born 1989), English footballer and former actor 
Edward Savage (artist) (1761–1817), American portrait painter and engraver
Edward Savage 1628 MP for Midhurst (UK Parliament constituency)
Edward Savage (died c. 1622), MP for Newton and Stockbridge
Ted Savage (athlete) (1887–1920), Canadian Olympic hurdler